The 2010 Madrid Masters (also known as the Mutua Madrileña Madrid Open for sponsorship reasons) was played on outdoor clay courts at the Park Manzanares in Madrid, Spain from May 7–16. It was the 9th edition of the event on the ATP and 2nd on the WTA. It was classified as an ATP World Tour Masters 1000 event on the 2010 ATP World Tour and a Premier Mandatory event on the 2010 WTA Tour.

ATP entrants

Seeds

 Rankings are as of May 3, 2010.

Other entrants
The following players received wildcards into the main draw:
  Marcel Granollers
  Carlos Moyá
  Pere Riba
  David Nalbandian

The following players received entry from the qualifying draw:
  Kevin Anderson
  Juan Ignacio Chela
  Oleksandr Dolgopolov Jr.
  Daniel Gimeno Traver
  Santiago Giraldo
  Daniel Muñoz de la Nava
  Christophe Rochus

The following players received lucky loser spots:
  Michael Russell
  Mardy Fish
  Óscar Hernández

Withdrawals
The following notable players withdrew from the event:
 Novak Djokovic (allergies)
 Andy Roddick (stomach virus)
 Juan Martín del Potro (right wrist)
 Nikolay Davydenko (broken wrist)
 Fernando González (knee injury)
 Ivan Ljubičić (left side strain)
 Tomáš Berdych (right hip injury)
 Juan Carlos Ferrero (knee injury)
 Tommy Haas (right hip surgery)
 Tommy Robredo (back injury)
 Gilles Simon (right knee)
 Radek Štěpánek (fatigue)
 David Nalbandian (leg injury)

WTA entrants

Seeds

 Rankings are as of May 3, 2010.

Other entrants
The following players received wildcards into the main draw:
  Sybille Bammer
  Ana Ivanovic
  Arantxa Parra Santonja
  Peng Shuai
  Virginia Ruano Pascual

The following players received entry from the qualifying draw:
  Akgul Amanmuradova
  Iveta Benešová
  Alizé Cornet
  Kirsten Flipkens
  Beatriz García Vidagany
  Petra Kvitová
  Stefanie Vögele
  Klára Zakopalová

The following player received the lucky loser spot:
  Tathiana Garbin

Withdrawals
The following notable players withdrew from this event:
  Kim Clijsters (left foot)
  Yanina Wickmayer (elbow injury)
  Kateryna Bondarenko (left knee injury)

Finals

Men's singles

 Rafael Nadal defeated  Roger Federer 6–4, 7–6(7–5)
It was Nadal's third title of the year and 39th of his career. It was his 18th Masters title, setting the all-time record. It was his 2nd win at Madrid, also winning in 2005.

Women's singles

 Aravane Rezaï defeated  Venus Williams 6–2, 7–5
It was Rezaï's first title of the year and 3rd of her career.

Men's doubles

 Bob Bryan  /  Mike Bryan defeated  Daniel Nestor /  Nenad Zimonjić 6–3, 6–4
It was the Bryans' 5th title of the year and 61st as a team.

Women's doubles

 Serena Williams /  Venus Williams defeated  Gisela Dulko /  Flavia Pennetta 6–2, 7–5
It was the Williams' 2nd title of the year, and 18th overall as a team.

References

External links
 Official website